Pye Kwit is a human settlement in Myanmar on the border of the Magway and Mandalay regions.

Location 
According to Google Maps, Pye Kwit has several small dense roads marking its location with a small river splitting the settlement into two sides.

References 

Populated places in Myanmar